Flight Deck (formerly Top Gun) is a steel inverted roller coaster located at California's Great America in Santa Clara, California. Built by Bolliger & Mabillard and designed by Werner Stengel, the roller coaster made its debut on March 20, 1993, as Top Gun. The roller coaster was built as Paramount, who had purchased the Great America theme park in 1992 along with several other parks, sought to expand its entertainment opportunities and promote its films. After Paramount sold off its Great America park to Cedar Fair, the roller coaster was rebranded as Flight Deck.   

The roller coaster was the second Bolliger & Mabillard Inverted model to be built. Originally themed to the Top Gun film, the roller coaster thematically was set on an aircraft carrier with various displays. Upon opening, the roller coaster received mostly positive reviews from critics and guests.

History
Paramount Communications Inc. announced its intentions to purchase Kings Entertainment Company for $400 million on July 31, 1992. The planned acquisition would see the transfer of four theme parks owned or operated by the Kings Entertainment Company under the Paramount brand, which included Great America. Paramount was one of several entertainment companies that would acquire or purchase stakes in amusement parks to expand live entertainment opportunities and promote films. It was expected Paramount would develop rides based on films and franchises such as Top Gun, Star Trek, or The Addams Family.

Great America became Paramount's Great America under the newly formed Paramount Parks, which planned to expand thematic elements in their park, including the addition of a Top Gun attraction to open in March 1993. Construction on the station was underway in January 1993. Top Gun later opened with the park on March 20, the first operating season under Paramount and the 18th for Great America. Top Gun was one of several movie-inspired attractions to open during the 1993 season, which included Batman: The Ride at Six Flags Great Adventure, Jaws at Universal Studios Florida, and Back to the Future: The Ride at Universal Studios Hollywood. After Paramount sold off Great America to Cedar Fair in 2006, the Top Gun theming was removed and the name changed to Flight Deck.

Ride experience
The train departs making small right turn out of the station, ascending the  chain lift hill. The drop at the top of the hill begins with a sharp left turn. The train enters a vertical loop, then performs a right-banked 270-degree turn before dipping down and up into a zero-gravity roll. Following the inversion, the train makes a short dive and then banks left into a flat right turn. The train then maneuvers into a shallow drop, immediately followed by a corkscrew. Exiting the corkscrew, the train enters a left-banked 270-degree turn over a pond before turning right into the brake run and station. One roller coaster cycle takes around two minutes and twenty-six seconds to complete.

Characteristics 
Flight Deck is a custom Inverted Coaster model manufactured by Bolliger & Mabillard (B&M) and designed by Werner Stengel. Upon opening, the roller coaster was the second B&M Inverted Coaster model to be built. Flight Deck operates with two trains. Each of the two trains can accommodate 28 passengers, arranged in seven rows with four to a single row. Each seat features an over-the-shoulder restraint. The roller coaster exerts 4.5 g-forces to its riders. Flight Deck was repainted in 2014 to feature a red track and white support color scheme.

The original roller coaster was themed to the Top Gun film. The roller coaster itself represented the F-14 Tomcat Tom Cruise's character piloted, with guests said to assemble for a military conflict. The queue area presented various displays of an aircraft carrier, including a tower, storage facilities, and an engine. The queue area played songs from the film's soundtrack, as well as voice clips from the film. A large mural was created depicting "Fightertown, USA", an homage to Miramar's Air Station, on one side with an aircraft carrier on the other. The station represented the flight deck of the aircraft carrier, with ride operators adorned in relevant uniforms. When renamed to Flight Deck, the roller coaster received a new color scheme. During the 2021 off-season, the park revitalized the queue area to restore the classic aircraft theming.

Incidents and accidents 
A man was killed on the ground by a passing train of Top Gun on September 7, 1998. The man had previously ridden the roller coaster where he had lost a hat under a section of track and went to retrieve it. A park official stated the victim had to pass through a noted employee door and  fence to enter the area he had occupied. The man had been accidentally struck in the head by the foot of a 20-year-old female rider on the roller coaster. The female rider was treated at a local hospital for a broken leg. The man, who was visiting from Mexico, was said to only speak Spanish and could not read the English safety signs displayed.

An employee working Flight Deck was seriously injured after being struck by a train moving into the roller coaster's station on June 12, 2015. A passenger on the roller coaster was also injured, sustaining injuries to their hand and legs when the employee retrieved an item in the train's path. The roller coaster remained temporarily closed thereafter pending an investigation. Cedar Fair was later fined $70,200 by California's Occupational Safety and Health (OSHA) branch relating to eight violations in safety, two pertaining to the accident.

Reception 

Upon opening, the roller coaster received generally positive reviews from critics and guests. Cheri Matthews, a writer for The Modesto Bee, noted guest reactions to the roller coaster, with an American Coaster Enthusiast member stating it was their "favorite steel coaster" with another guest having exclaimed it was better than nearby steel roller coaster, Vortex. Matthews also recorded several pilot's reactions to the roller coaster, with a former United States Air Force pilot stating the ride experience was not dissatisfying and a United States Navy Commander noting it was akin to a fighter jet, especially the vertical loop without the g-forces. 

Susan Young, a writer for the Oakland Tribune, noted how she felt an adrenaline rush through the queue area's theming and overhead roller coaster. By the end of the roller coaster, Young remarked that Top Gun was "pure exhilaration", having restored her interest in roller coasters altogether. Leigh Grogan, a writer for The Sacramento Bee, commented that, "despite being a lifelong" wooden roller coaster fan, she gave "high marks" to the roller coaster's thematic experience, satisfied with the ride and its g-forces. Debra Salonen, writing for the Merced Sun-Star, positively noted the roller coaster's smoothness, speed, and excitement, simply concluding it was a "wow". Leah Smith, a reporter for the Press-Tribune, commented on the roller coaster's "breathtaking" elements alongside the in-depth theming that guests could expect waiting for the ride.

Awards

References

External links

Roller coasters in California
Roller coasters operated by Cedar Fair
Roller coasters introduced in 1993
California's Great America
Inverted roller coasters manufactured by Bolliger & Mabillard